Matthias Kaiser (born 22 January 1991) is a Liechtenstein racing driver currently competing in the European Le Mans Series with Mühlner Motorsport.

He is the 2019 champion of the Ultimate Cup Series in the Challenge Proto-LMP3 category.

Racing record

Racing career summary 

† As Kaiser was a guest driver, he was ineligible to score points.
* Season still in progress.

Complete European Le Mans Series results 
(key) (Races in bold indicate pole position; results in italics indicate fastest lap)

Complete FIA World Endurance Championship results
(key) (Races in bold indicate pole position) (Races in italics indicate fastest lap)

References

External links 

 

1991 births
Living people
Liechtenstein racing drivers
European Le Mans Series drivers
24H Series drivers
Nürburgring 24 Hours drivers
Asian Le Mans Series drivers
Graff Racing drivers
Phoenix Racing drivers
Le Mans Cup drivers
FIA World Endurance Championship drivers